"You're Gonna Get Rocked!" is a 1988 song by American singer La Toya Jackson, taken from her 1988 album La Toya. Released on March 27, 1988, The single, produced by popular hip hop hitmakers Full Force, was among her most successful.

Song information
The single was released throughout the U.S., Europe, and Canada. It peaked at #103, barely missing the Billboard Hot 100. It also peaked at #66 on the Billboard Hot R&B/Hip-Hop Singles & Tracks chart, #90 in the United Kingdom, #82 in the Netherlands and #42 in New Zealand. The B-side of the single was the album track "Does It Really Matter".

"You're Gonna Get Rocked!" is the third of five songs by La Toya Jackson to have an accompanying music video. The clip was directed by Greg Gold and was released in October 1988. A huge promotion campaign followed in the fall of 1988, with Jackson performing the song live on many different TV shows worldwide. The track samples James Brown's "Funky President". The Miami News reviewed the song as having a "heavy funk beat" that does "grind to a fierce rhythm track."

Music video
The music video depicts Jackson as the head of a motorcycle gang. Clad in leather and rhinestones, Jackson cruises through an urban street on the back of a motorbike. She demands respect from the local street toughs and performs a dance number with the members of her gang. The edgy clip drew comparisons to her brother Michael Jackson's short film for his single "Bad."

Notable live performances
Jackson performed "You're Gonna Get Rocked" on the German TV shows Eurotops and Extratour, on the Dutch program "Countdown", in Caracas for Venezuelan television, and in her September 1989 live pay-per-view concert at Bally's Reno. Also it was performed on Chilean Tv Program " Porque hoy es Sabado" where it was coregraphied by Hugo Urrutia, a well known Chilean dancer.

Charts

Versions
 Album version
 Radio edit
 Single version
 12" remix
 7" edit
 Extended version
 Bonus beats
 Dub
 Full Force Hard-Core Mix
 Full Force "Get Busy" Mix

References

La Toya Jackson songs
1988 songs
Song recordings produced by Full Force
RCA Records singles